Schools in California may refer to the following:

 List of high schools in California
 List of school districts in California
 Education in California

See also
:Category:Schools in California
California School (disambiguation)
California (disambiguation)